Moundsville is a city in and the county seat of Marshall County, West Virginia, United States, along the Ohio River. The population was 8,122 at the 2020 census. It is part of the Wheeling metropolitan area. The city was named for the nearby ancient Grave Creek Mound, constructed 250 to 100 BC by indigenous people of the Adena culture.

History

In 1771,  English colonists Samuel and James Tomlinson built a cabin at what later became Moundsville, although they did not overwinter, and in fact left for several years after attacks by Native Americans. Elizabethtown, as Tomlinson's community was called, was incorporated in 1830 and would become the county seat upon the creation of Marshall County in 1835. Nearby, the town of Mound City was incorporated in 1832. The two towns combined in 1865.  In 1852 a line of the Baltimore and Ohio Railroad opened, connecting the eastern rail network with the Ohio and Mississippi riverboat system; Moundsville was an important port until 1861, when the Civil War shut down the river system and caused major damage to the railroad. Fostoria Glass Company (specializing in hand-blown glassworks) was headquartered in Moundsville from 1891 to 1986. The retired West Virginia State Penitentiary operated in Moundsville from 1867 to 1995.  On August 4, 1927, Charles Lindbergh landed The Spirit of St. Louis at Langin Field in Moundsville.

Geography

Climate
The climate in this area is characterized by relatively high temperatures and evenly distributed precipitation throughout the year.  According to the Köppen Climate Classification system, Moundsville has a Humid subtropical climate, abbreviated "Cfa" on climate maps.
<div style="width:65%">

</div style>

Demographics

2010 census
As of the census of 2010, there were 9,318 people, 4,016 households, and 2,445 families living in the city. The racial makeup of the city was 97.5% White, 0.8% African American, 0.2% Native American, 0.4% Asian, 0.2% from other races, and 0.9% from two or more races. Hispanic or Latino of any race were 1.1% of the population.

There were 4,016 households, of which 25.4% had children under the age of 18 living with them, 41.2% were married couples living together, 14.5% had a female householder with no husband present, 5.1% had a male householder with no wife present, and 39.1% were non-families. 33.7% of all households were made up of individuals, and 16.4% had someone living alone who was 65 years of age or older. The average household size was 2.21 and the average family size was 2.79.

The median age in the city was 45.2 years. 19.4% of residents were under the age of 18; 7.1% were between the ages of 18 and 24; 23.2% were from 25 to 44; 30.1% were from 45 to 64; and 20.1% were 65 years of age or older. The gender makeup of the city was 47.9% male and 52.1% female.

2000 census
As of the census of 2000, there were 9,998 people, 4,122 households, and 2,662 families living in the city. The population density was 3,399.0 people per square mile (1,313.0/km2). There were 4,461 housing units at an average density of 1,516.6 per square mile (585.9/km2). The racial makeup of the city was 98.13% White, 0.73% African American, 0.13% Native American, 0.30% Asian, 0.01% Pacific Islander, 0.10% from other races, and 0.60% from two or more races. Hispanic or Latino of any race were 1.16% of the population.

There were 4,122 households, out of which 25.5% had children under the age of 18 living with them, 47.7% were married couples living together, 13.3% had a female householder with no husband present, and 35.4% were non-families. 31.4% of all households were made up of individuals, and 17.0% had someone living alone who was 65 years of age or older. The average household size was 2.28 and the average family size was 2.84.

In the city the population was spread out, with 20.4% under the age of 18, 7.8% from 18 to 24, 26.8% from 25 to 44, 24.9% from 45 to 64, and 20.0% who were 65 years of age or older. The median age was 42 years. For every 100 females, there were 92.3 males. For every 100 females age 18 and over, there were 89.0 males.

The median income for a household in the city was $23,107, and the median income for a family was $30,534. Males had a median income of $26,242 versus $19,348 for females. The per capita income for the city was $13,997. About 18.1% of families and 22.4% of the population were below the poverty line, including 33.2% of those under age 18 and 15.5% of those age 65 or over.

Notable people
 Edward L. Athey, sports coach at Washington College. 
 Steve Crabtree, Republican politician and media personality
 Frank De Vol, film and television music composer and actor
 Virginia B. Evans, painter, glass artist, and teacher
 Joseph W. Gallaher, businessman and politician
 Davis Grubb, novelist and story writer
 Kristin Lewicki, professional ice hockey player
 Adrian Melott, astrophysicist and astrobiologist
 Arch A. Moore, Jr., former Governor of West Virginia
 Ed Pastilong, football player, coach, and college athletics administrator, WVU's Director of Athletics for 21 years
 Ted Valentine, NCAA men's basketball referee and 2005 Naismith College Official of the Year.

In popular culture

In 2018, documentary filmmakers David Bernabo and John W. Miller released Moundsville, a documentary about the history of Moundsville.

You Missed My Heart, a song by Mark Kozelek of Sun Kil Moon and Jimmy LaValle, references a prison cemetery in Moundsville. This song has also been covered by Phoebe Bridgers.

References

External links

 City's official website
 

 
Cities in West Virginia
Cities in Marshall County, West Virginia
County seats in West Virginia
West Virginia populated places on the Ohio River
1771 establishments in Virginia
Populated places established in 1771